Janez (Evangelist) Kalan (20 October 1868 – 27 April 1945), was a Slovene Roman Catholic priest, editor, and writer.

Life
Kalan was born in the village of Suha. He attended elementary school in Škofja Loka, followed by secondary school (from 1879 to 1887) and seminary (from 1887 to 1891) in Ljubljana. He was ordained a priest in 1891, after which he served as a curate in Dol pri Ljubljani from 1891 to 1893 and in Kamnik from 1893 to 1900. From 1900 to 1904 he was a vicar in Ljubljana, and from 1904 to 1908 the parish priest in Zapoge.

From 1903 to 1924 he was the Episcopal head of the campaign against alcoholism; he left his position as parish priest in 1908 in order to dedicate himself to this task. His zeal against alcohol earned him the deprecatory nickname Wasserkalan 'water Kalan'. In 1903 he founded the religious monthly periodical Bogoljub (God’s Love) and edited it until the end of 1924, when he left to serve among Slovene workers in North Rhine-Westphalia. In 1923 he also served as a missionary among Slovene emigrants in southern Serbia. Kalan wrote a number of books.

Work
In 1903 Kalan founded the Sveta vojska (Holy Army) anti-alcohol association, the work of which was propagated in the newsletters Zlata doba (Golden Age; 1910–1920) and Prerodu (Rebirth, 1922–). In 1913 he started publishing the professional clerical newsletter Vzajemnost (Reciprocity) and edited it until 1924. In 1916, together with Anton Mrkun he founded the Dobrodelnost (Charity) charitable association. In 1925 he started publishing the newsletter Naš zvon (Our Bell) in Germany. In addition to his publications in the newsletters that he edited, he also contributed to the newspapers Slovenec and Domoljub.<ref>Slovenski biografski leksikon 1925–1991. (2009). Electronic edition. Ljubljana: SAZU.</ref>

 Bibliography 
 Vodnik marijanski 
 Družabnik Marijin 
 Šmarnice arskega župnika 
 Bog med nami 
 Kristus kraljuj 
 Pridige enega leta: za vse nedelje, praznike in posebne prilike Početek protialkoholnega gibanja na Slovenskem 
 Kaj je torej z alkoholizmom? 
 Sveta vojska 
 Konec pravdi o alkoholu 
 Velik moment 
 Slovensko dekle 
 K višku zdaj dežela vsa 
 Primite tatu 
 Zločin nad domovino 
 S krampom in gorjačo 
 Ajmo, mi Sokoli 
 Nova vera 
 Fantič, le gori vstan! 
 Pozdrav iz domovine 
 Pojte! 
 Prepevajte! 
 Da se poznamo 
 Rešimo slovenščino 
 Za lepo, domačo slovenščino''

References 

1868 births
1945 deaths
19th-century Slovenian Roman Catholic priests
Slovenian Roman Catholic missionaries
People from the Municipality of Škofja Loka
Roman Catholic missionaries in Serbia
20th-century Slovenian Roman Catholic priests